Vtelno may refer to:
Mělnické Vtelno, village and municipality in Mělník District, Central Bohemian Region, Czech Republic 
Jizerní Vtelno, village and municipality in Mladá Boleslav District, Central Bohemian Region, Czech Republic
Vtelno (Most), former village, now district of the city of Most, Czech Republic, (:cs:Vtelno (Most))